is a Japanese honorary title given to a warrior of legendary skill in swordsmanship. The literal translation of kensei is "sword saint". Thus, the term is considered by some to imply a higher degree of perfection (possibly also encompassing a moral dimension) than the more commonly used  or "sword master". This is not to be confused with the word , meaning swordsman.
Among the most famous kensei is Miyamoto Musashi, although not all would apply the term to him. Other historical kensei are often the founders of popular schools of swordsmanship. Although there is no such written rule, the title carries such prestige that it is commonly understood that there should be no more than one kensei at any given time.

In popular culture 

 The 2020 video game Ghost of Tsushima features a ronin named Kojiro, described as a slayer of legends with a tireless sword arm, who impressed the spirits of death with his skill in combat. Defeating Kojiro in a duel awards the Kensei Armor.
 The 2019 video game Sekiro: Shadows Die Twice uses the term "sword saint" to title one of its characters (and bosses) known as Isshin, the Sword Saint. The Japanese release of the game refers to him as Kensei Ashina Isshin.
 The 2017 video game For Honor Features a playable character named Kensei.
 The 2008 video game Wizard 101 features a wearable badge called "sword saint" attainable through the Asian-themed world Mooshoo.
 The 2012 light novel Re:Zero - Starting Life in Another World has three characters who have held the title of Sword Saint in-universe (While there have been multiple, these are the ones readers know the most about): Reid Astrea, Theresia van Astrea, and Reinhard van Astrea. Both Theresia and Reinhard are Reid's descendants, with Theresia being Reinhard's grandmother. Reinhard is the strongest character in the series, while Reid is one of the strongest, and is actually more skilled with the sword than Reinhard. In-universe, "Sword Saint" is a title and power held by the Astrea Family. It's given to those who have the Divine Protection of the Sword Saint, though Reid, the first, did not have the Divine Protection.
 The 2011 Pathfinder Roleplaying Game first-edition sourcebook Ultimate Combat adds a variant of the magus class called the Kensai. The 2018 video game Pathfinder: Kingmaker and the 2021 video game Pathfinder: Wrath of the Righteous, both based on the Pathfinder system, include the Kensai under the name Sword Saint.
 The 2017 supplementary rulebook for the 5th Edition of the Dungeons and Dragons roleplaying game, titled Xanathar's Guide to Everything, adds a subclass for the Monk class called "Way of the Kensei".

References

Japanese martial arts terminology
Japanese swordfighters